, nicknamed "Nemo", is a former Japanese professional baseball infielder. He was born on July 8, 1983. He is currently playing for the Chiba Lotte Marines of the NPB.

References

1983 births
Living people
Chiba Lotte Marines players
Japanese baseball coaches
Japanese baseball players
Nippon Professional Baseball coaches
Nippon Professional Baseball infielders
Baseball people from Tokyo